Drift is a BBC Books original novel written by Simon A. Forward and based on the long-running British science fiction television series Doctor Who. It features the Fourth Doctor and Leela.

Synopsis
It is winter in New Hampshire. The US military is pursuing a survivalist while battling a series of unnatural sexual pleasures. They are also holding a snow-blowing threat that could threaten the entire world if it is not stopped.

References

External links

2002 British novels
2002 science fiction novels
Past Doctor Adventures
Fourth Doctor novels
Novels by Simon A. Forward
Novels set in New Hampshire